The Cardiff Demons RLFC name has been used multiple times over the years. Firstly for a now-defunct men's rugby league side, and subsequently for a women's rugby league side who began in 2021.

The men's sids played out of St. Peters RFC in the east of Cardiff, Wales and played in the Welsh Premier of the Rugby League Conference.

The women's team on the other hand  compete in the RFL Women's Super League South since its inaugural season in June 2021.

Men's Team: 1997-2015

History
Cardiff Demons were formed in 1997 as an Academy level club, competing in the Lower Division of the Rugby League Academy competition against young players from professional outfits in the North of England. The Demons reached the Grand Final of the Academy Division Two in their second season but lost to Hunslet Hawks.

They amalgamated with the UWIC University side in 1999 to play in the 1999-2000 Rugby League Challenge Cup. This was a great success with Cardiff beating Durham and Rochdale Mayfield to reach the third round losing to National League side Keighley Cougars.

Due to the success of this great cup run, in 2001, they joined the Central South Division of the Rugby League Conference. Playing at St. Peter's RFC, a small club two miles north of the city centre, the Demons succeeded in finishing in a creditable third place and came within seconds of pulling off a major upset at Hemel Stags, only to be denied when the highly rated Stags scored a last-second try. Another notable success from the Demons’ inaugural season was the graduation of winger Jon Breakingbury on to the professional ranks when he signed for Sheffield Eagles. Their continued success inspired other clubs from around Wales to form.

For the 2002 season the Demons moved to the well-appointed surroundings of Old Penarthians RFC in the seaside district of Penarth. Again competing in the Central South Division Cardiff defeated Worcester, Oxford Cavaliers and Gloucestershire Warriors home and away to secure the runners up spot. The clashes with Gloucestershire will long be remembered; the Demons won the season opener 44-36 away in a see-saw battle which saw the lead change hands four times, but even that contest was eclipsed by the excitement of the return match. Cardiff squandered a 22-8 lead to trail 28-22 with five minutes remaining. A late converted try and a last minute drop goal from Evan Powell turned the tables to give the Demons an unlikely 29-28 victory. The season was also marked by a visit to the York Nines and an invitation to enter the Rugby League Challenge Cup, which resulted in a memorable trip to play Shaw Cross Sharks of Dewsbury.

2003 saw the Demons go from strength to strength, finishing top of the South West Conference with an excellent record of nine wins and only one defeat, their biggest wins being 90-0 and 100-8, both over local rivals Bristol Sonics. The former was an historic day for the city of Cardiff all round with local football side, Cardiff City beating Bristol City only two hours earlier. The Demons lost in the play-offs to Welsh side, Bridgend Blue Bulls, this match being featured on Sky Sports’ magazine programme, Boots N' All.

2003 saw the departure of Aled James. He and Wes Palmer both represented Great Britain national rugby league team students on their tour down under, with Aled signing for Widnes Vikings at the conclusion of this tour. Although former Demons players had previously gone on to play Super League, this was the first time that a Super League club had signed a player directly from them benefiting the club financially in the short term.

In 2004, the Demons moved to Taffs Well, joined the Welsh Conference and won two trophies. First was the Welsh Shield after beating Newport Titans with a last minute try from the superb Gareth Jones, then beating Thorne Moor Marauders in National Shield despite a strong second-half comeback from the Yorkshiremen.

2005 saw a season of consolidation with the Demons having a slightly better league record but losing in the first round of the play-offs to Valley Cougars.

The club lost just two players to Crusaders with Andre Boon and Oliver Hughes departing to join the new professional club based in Bridgend.

The Demons moved back to St Peters RFC after one home match of 2006 and went on to win the East Division and reach the Welsh Conference Grand Final, only to lose 22-10 to Bridgend Blue Bulls. The following year the Demons lost out to Newport Titans 14-6 in the first round of the playoffs, but in 2008 they were semi-finalists losing 26-20 to Blackwood Bulldogs. In 2009 they relocated to St Albans RFC in Tremorfa but a promising season was ended by a playoff loss to Valley Cougars. Former Demons player Elliot Kear went on to appear regularly in the Super League for the Crusaders and the Bradford Bulls.

In 2010 the Cardiff Demons posted a regular season record of 6 wins and 4 losses, to finish in 3rd place in the new Co-operative Welsh Premier Conference Rugby League competition. In 2011 the Demons were restricted to three wins out of 10 regular season fixtures, but thanks to home and away victories over close rivals Torfaen Tigers they were still able to finish in fourth place in the competition.

After a period of restructuring between 2012–14, with a handful of wins each season, the two main Rugby League clubs in the city, Demons and the Cardiff Spartans decided to merge. The result was Cardiff City Blue Dragons RLFC (a resurrection of the name of the last professional RL side in Cardiff and kit colours) now running two open age sides for the 2015 Welsh Conference season and playing home games at Cardiff Arms Park. The merged club also includes age grade sides at u15 and aims to promote a strong pathway for potential players in the city for years ahead. In 2019 the club is the largest RL club in Wales with sides at all age grades, a Welsh Premier and Southern Conference side, as well the first Women's and Masters RL sides in Wales.

Honours

 RLC South West Division: 2003
 Welsh Shield: 2004
 RLC Shield: 2004
 Welsh Nines Winners: 2006
 Welsh Premier (East): 2006
 Welsh Nines Winners: 2008

Statistics

 Year Formed: 1997 
 Previous Grounds: Old Penarthians RFC, 1997-2000, St Peters RFC, 2001, Old Penarthians RFC, 2002-2003, Taffs Well RFC, 2004-2006, St Peters RFC, 2007-2008.
 Record League victory: 100-8 vs. Bristol Sonics, RLC South West Division, 2003.
 Record Cup victory: 36-6 vs. Durham, Rugby League Challenge Cup First Round, 1999-2000. 
 Heaviest Defeat 0-90 vs. Keighley Cougars, Rugby League Challenge Cup Third Round, 1999-2000.

Women's Team: 2021-Present

History
After a number of years of dormancy, the Cardiff Demons name was resurrected in 2021 for a new women's rugby league team, set to compete in the inaugural season of the RFL Women's Super League South competition, starting in June 2021. The club won the inaugural season beating the Army team 30-26.

Seasons

See also

Sport in Cardiff 
Rugby league in Wales

References

External links
 Cardiff Demons website
 Official Wales Rugby League website

1997 establishments in Wales
Rugby clubs established in 1997
Welsh rugby league teams
Rugby League Conference teams
Demons
Cardiff Metropolitan University